The 5th Lumières Awards ceremony, presented by the Académie des Lumières, was held on 29 January 2000. The ceremony was chaired by Claudia Cardinale. The "Most Promising Actor" and "Most Promising Actress" awards were introduced in that year. The Messenger: The Story of Joan of Arc won two awards including Best Film and Best Director.

Winners

See also
 25th César Awards

References

External links
 
 
 5th Lumières Awards at AlloCiné

Lumières Awards
Lumières
Lumières
Lumières Awards
Lumières Awards